The Andrew Neil Show may refer to:

 The Andrew Neil Show (2019 TV programme)
 The Andrew Neil Show (2022 TV programme)